"Marina del Rey" is a song recorded by American country music artist George Strait. It was released in September 1982 as the second single from his album Strait from the Heart, which went on to be certified platinum by the RIAA.  It peaked at number 6 in the United States, and number 2 in Canada. The song is set in Marina del Rey, California, and it is structured as a slow romantic ballad. Longtime country songwriters Frank Dycus and Dean Dillon composed the tune.

Content
The song is about a love affair on the beach. A man and a woman get together and have a good time during a vacation. They create many memories and then go their separate ways – back to their normal lives.

Critical reception
Kevin John Coyne of Country Universe gave the song a B grade, saying that the lyrics are "appropriately longing and sentimental for times gone by, but Strait hasn’t yet developed enough as a vocalist to pull off the mature performance required."

Chart positions

References

Songs about cities
Songs about California
1982 singles
1982 songs
George Strait songs
Marina del Rey, California
Songs written by Dean Dillon
Songs written by Frank Dycus
MCA Records singles